The South African Open – formerly known as the South African Championships, and for sponsorship reasons the Altech NCR South African Open and the Panasonic South African Open – is a defunct Grand Prix Tennis Tour, World Championship Series, ATP Tour and Virginia Slims Circuit affiliated tennis tournament played from 1891 to 2011 in South Africa. It was part of the pre-open era international seasonal tours from 1891 to 1967 from 1968 to 1971, part of the open era independent events tour from 1972, when it became part the men's Grand Prix Tour until 1989. The women's side of the competition was only briefly part of Virginia Slims tour (1970–74) before it returned to the independent circuit.

The men's event joined the ATP Tour in 1990. It was mainly held in Johannesburg in South Africa, but played in other locations such as Cape Town, Durban, Port Elizabeth, East London, Bloemfontein, Kimberly and Pretoria. The tournament was played on outdoor hard courts it ran for a period of 120 years until 2011.

History
The first South African Championships were first played in 1891 until 1967 and took place in Port Elizabeth. The tournament was held at and organized by the Port Elizabeth Lawn Tennis Club. This inaugural edition consisted of a men's singles, women's singles, men's doubles and mixed doubles event. The tournament was not played from 1900 to 1902 due to the Boer War. After the formation of the South African Lawn Tennis Union in 1903 the location of the tournament circulated between Johannesburg, Cape Town, Durban, Port Elizabeth, East London, Bloemfontein, Kimberly and Pretoria. In 1905 the women's doubles competition was added. The tournament was not held from 1915 to 1919 due to World War I, and from 1941 to 1945 due to World War II. The first men's singles winner was Lionel Richardson from Bloemfontein. In 1931 Ellis Park in Johannesburg became the permanent venue for the championships. In 1968 the event went open and was from then on known as the South African Open Sets were played on advantage until 1971; Lingering death tiebreaks at six games all were subsequently adopted. Finals were the best-of-five-sets until the tournament's suspension in 1990; upon its return in 1992 finals were reduced to the best-of-three-sets the men's tournament was suspended again from 1996 until 2006. The women's tournament was also stopped in 1982,1985 and 1988 it was played in 1990 but did not continue after that date.

ATP Tour tennis returned to South Africa in 2009 under the banner of the SA Tennis Open. The history of this event, however, is not part of the history of the Open. The Tennis Open, which was part of the 250 series of events, was discontinued in 2011.

The most successful male player at the South African Championships – played from 1891 to 1967 during the Amateur Era – was Eric Sturgess, who won eleven titles between 1939 and 1957 and lost a further final in 1947 to Eustace Fannin. He also holds the overall record for the most consecutive titles won – seven between 1948 and 1954. Five players share the record for the most male wins at the tournament in the Open Era – Rod Laver (1969, 1970), Jimmy Connors (1973, 1974), Harold Solomon (1975, 1976), Vitas Gerulaitis (1981, 1982) and Aaron Krickstein (1992, 1993).

The most successful female player at the South African Championships – played from 1891 to 1967 during the Amateur Era – was Mrs H.A. Kirby, who won six titles between 1904 and 1912. She also shares the overall record for the most consecutive titles won with Miss H. Grant. Both players won four consecutive titles – Grant won the first four South African titles from 1891 to 1894 and Mrs Kirby won four titles between 1904 and 1907. Margaret Court and Brigitte Cuypers share the record for the most wins at the tournament in the Open Era. Court won three titles in 1968, 1970 and 1971 and Cuypers won in 1976, 1978 and 1979.

The following comprises the full list of South African Open men's singles champions. and South African Open women's singles champions.

Results
NB: The following tables below comprise full lists of champions from 1891 until 2011

Men's singles

Men's doubles

Women's singles

See also
 SA Tennis Open

References

 
Grand Prix tennis circuit
ATP Tour
Hard court tennis tournaments
Tennis tournaments in South Africa
Sports competitions in Johannesburg
Sport in Durban
Recurring sporting events established in 1891
Recurring events disestablished in 1995
Defunct tennis tournaments in South Africa
1891 establishments in South Africa
Defunct sports competitions in South Africa